The 66th Nations Cup in roller hockey was the 2015 edition of the Nations Cup. 
The competition was hosted as normal in Montreux from 1 to 5 April 2015.

Group stage

Group A

Group B

Final Phase

5th-8th places

Champion

Semifinals

Final

Final ranking

References

External links
 Official website

Nations Cup (roller hockey)
N
Sport in Montreux
2015 in roller hockey
2015 in Swiss sport